Wheelchair tennis at the 2000 Summer Paralympics consisted of doubles and singles competitions for men and women.

Medal table

Participating nations

Medallists 

Source: Paralympic.org

References 

 

 
2000 Summer Paralympics events
2000
Paralympics